Cyrtopeltocoris is a genus of plant bugs in the family Miridae. There are about 11 described species in Cyrtopeltocoris.

Species
These 11 species belong to the genus Cyrtopeltocoris:
 Cyrtopeltocoris ajo Knight, 1968
 Cyrtopeltocoris albofasciatus Reuter, 1876
 Cyrtopeltocoris arizonae Knight, 1968
 Cyrtopeltocoris balli Knight, 1968
 Cyrtopeltocoris barberi Knight, 1968
 Cyrtopeltocoris conicatus Knight, 1968
 Cyrtopeltocoris cubanus Poppius, 1914
 Cyrtopeltocoris gracilentis Knight, 1930
 Cyrtopeltocoris huachucae Knight, 1968
 Cyrtopeltocoris illini Knight, 1941
 Cyrtopeltocoris oklahomae Knight, 1968

References

Further reading

 
 
 

Phylinae
Articles created by Qbugbot